Zagaly may refer to:

Zağalı, Azerbaijan
Zağaaltı, Azerbaijan